Stanley Archibald Penberthy (3 June 1906 – 31 March 1989) was an Australian rules footballer who played with Footscray and Melbourne in the Victorian Football League (VFL).

Penberthy, a follower, played 81 games at Subiaco between 1927 and 1931. Amongst his seven interstate appearances for Western Australia were games at the 1930 Adelaide Carnival. He also played cricket for Subiaco.

In 1932 he left the state and joined Footscray, with whom he would spend five and a half seasons. He captained Footscray in 1936 and for the early rounds of the 1937 season, before playing out the year with Melbourne. His last league game was a preliminary final, which Melbourne lost to Collingwood.

References

1906 births
1989 deaths
Australian rules footballers from Western Australia
Western Bulldogs players
Melbourne Football Club players
Subiaco Football Club players